Halil İbrahim Akça is a Turkish diplomat and was the 11th Secretary General of the Economic Cooperation Organization (ECO).

Education
Akça graduated with an undergraduate degree in Electronics and Communication Engineering from Istanbul Technical University in 1988. In 1994 he received a Master of Arts degree in Economics from the University of Delaware. He has published several papers on government economic policy and planning based on Turkish data.

Career

Akça held several positions within the Turkish government, including Under-Secretary of the State Planning Organization in 2009, and was a member of several Turkish government boards. He was the Turkish ambassador to Northern Cyprus from 2011 to 2015. Akça led the Economic Cooperation Organization as Secretary General from August 2015 through July 2018.

References

Living people
1963 births
University of Delaware alumni
Economic Cooperation Organization people